The 1978 IIHF European U18 Championship was the eleventh playing of the IIHF European Junior Championships.  This year's tournaments offered spectacular finishes in both Group A and Group B.  In Group B's championship game, the Italians led with three minutes to play before the French tied it at two.  Overtime was played in two five-minute halves, both teams scored once, and finally team Italy won in a shootout.

As great as that was, it still did not compare to the drama that Alpo Suhonen's Finnish team provided in winning Group A. Coming into the final game on January 2 in Helsinki, both Finland and the USSR had won all four previous games.  Additionally, in the games that counted in the round robin final, they had both won by a combined total of eight to three.  Coming into their last game, since a tie could not be settled by any rule, they would have to play overtime.  It was decided that if there was a tie, they would play one full period, and then the second period (if still needed) would be sudden death."  Tom Ratschunas, writing for "Total Hockey", stated that, "The overtime stage of the game with the Soviets is still the mother of all extended playing time in Finnish hockey."  The Finns tied the game at three with just a few minutes left in regulation.  Twice they tied it up in the first overtime, the second goal coming with just twenty seconds left.  Just one minute and forty-two seconds into the second overtime, Jari Kurri scored on Dmitri Saprykhin to make the hosts victorious.  An interesting side note to the Finnish triumph was that they played without their top defenceman, Reijo Ruotsalainen because he was chosen to play in the World Juniors, which were unfortunately played at the same time in Montreal.

Group A 
Played in Helsinki and Vantaa, Finland from December 27, 1977, to January 2, 1978.

First round 
Group 1

Group 2

Final round 
Championship round

Final Game Summary

Placing round

Norway was relegated to Group B for 1979.

Tournament Awards
Top Scorer: Henri Loher  (15 Points)
Top Goalie: Jari Paavola
Top Defenceman:Yevgeni Popikhin
Top Forward: Jari Kurri

Group B 
Played from March 1–5, 1978.

First round 
Group 1
Played in Den Bosch, Netherlands.

Group 2
Played in Deurne, Belgium

Placing round 

Italy was promoted to Group A, and Belgium was relegated to Group C, for 1979.

Group C
Played in Sofia Bulgaria from January 20–26, 1979.

Hungary was promoted to Group B for 1979.

References

Complete results

Junior
IIHF European Junior Championship tournament
International ice hockey competitions hosted by Finland
International ice hockey competitions hosted by the Netherlands
Euro
Sport in Vantaa
International sports competitions in Helsinki
1970s in Helsinki
December 1977 sports events in Europe
January 1978 sports events in Europe
Sports competitions in Sofia
1970s in Sofia
March 1978 sports events in Europe
Euro
Euro
Euro